Honkonen is a Finnish surname, most prevalent in Central Finland. Notable people with the surname include:

 Kuuno Honkonen (1922–1985), Finnish high jumper and politician
 Hannu Honkonen (born 1982), Finnish composer, music producer and musician
 Petri Honkonen (born 1987), Finnish politician

Finnish-language surnames
Surnames of Finnish origin